libxslt is the XSLT C library developed for the GNOME project. It provides an implementation of XSLT 1.0, plus most of the EXSLT set of processor-portable extensions functions and some of Saxon's evaluate and expressions extensions. libxslt is based on libxml2, which it uses for XML parsing, tree manipulation and XPath support. It is free software released under the MIT License and can be reused in commercial applications.

libxslt can be used either as library embedded into an application, or via the xsltproc command line tool. The integration into applications is eased by a multitude of language bindings and wrappers. Being written in C, libxslt is a fast and low-resource processor. This makes it a popular choice for DocBook formatting and as standard XSLT processor for programming languages like PHP, Perl or Python.

The WebKit layout engine (used e.g. in Apple Safari and Google Chrome web browser) uses the libxslt library to do XSL transformations.

See also

 libxml2
 Saxon XSLT (competitor)
 Xalan (competitor)

References

External links
 
 XML.com: Appreciating libxslt

C (programming language) libraries
Free software programmed in C
GNOME libraries
Software using the MIT license
XSLT processors